The Red Lion is a three-roomed Grade II listed public house at Snargate, Kent, TN29 9UQ.

It is on the Campaign for Real Ale's National Inventory of Historic Pub Interiors.

It was built in the 18th century.

A Finn's of Lydd Brewery, Style & Winch Brewery and later Courage Brewery house which has been in the continuous proprietorship of the Jemisons since 1911, variously named Alf's, Alf's, Doris's and Kate's representing each subsequent licensee from that family. The Jemison family bought the freehold of the pub from Courage in the 1970s.

Real ales and ciders are sold, being poured on gravity dispense from casks in the public bar.

References

Grade II listed pubs in Kent
National Inventory Pubs